The 1960 United States presidential election in North Dakota took place on November 8, 1960, as part of the 1960 United States presidential election. Voters chose four representatives, or electors, to the Electoral College, who voted for president and vice president.

North Dakota was won by incumbent Vice President Richard Nixon (R–California), running with United States Ambassador to the United Nations Henry Cabot Lodge, Jr., with 55.42% of the popular vote, against Senator John F. Kennedy (D–Massachusetts), running with Senator Lyndon B. Johnson, with 44.52% of the popular vote, a 10.90% margin of victory.

Results

Results by county

See also
 United States presidential elections in North Dakota

References

North Dakota
1960
1960 North Dakota elections